The 2021 Clare Senior Hurling Championship was a competition in hurling that was the 126th staging of the Clare Senior Hurling Championship since its establishment by the Clare County Board in 1887.

With Sixmilebridge having won back-to-back titles in 2019 and 2020, they are looking to be the first Clare club team to win a three-in-a-row since Newmarket-on-Fergus in 1973. They defeated near-neighbours O'Callaghan's Mills in the 2020 final who were contesting their first final since 1993 which they ironically also lost to Sixmilebridge.	

The 2021 Championship changed from the regular layout in adopting a group stage format. In 2020 a decision was made to not relegate any team from any championship in Clare due to the Coronavirus Pandemic.

Senior Championship Fixtures

Group stage
 One group of five and three groups of four.
 2020 semi-finalists are seeded and kept separate.
 Each team plays all the other teams in their group once. Two points are awarded for a win and one for a draw.
 The top two teams in each group advance to Quarter-Finals
 The third-placed teams in each group and the fourth-placed team in Group A move to Senior B Championship
 The four bottom-placed teams in each group contest Relegation Playoffs

Group A

Group B

Group C

Group D

Quarter-finals
 Played by top two placed teams from Groups A-D

Semi-finals

County Final

Other Fixtures

Senior B Championship 
 Played by four third-placed teams from Groups A-D, and the fourth-placed team from Group A

Relegation Playoffs 
 Played by the four bottom-placed teams from Groups A-D
 Top two teams remain in Senior Championship for 2022
 Bottom two teams relegated to Intermediate for 2022

References

External links

Clare Senior Hurling Championship
Clare Senior Hurling Championship